was a Rear Admiral in the Imperial Japanese Navy.

Senda was an officer in the IJN, and was stationed on the island of Biak, near New Guinea. Though he was the highest-ranking officer on the island, he was placed under the command of Kuzume Naoyuki, who was only a colonel. He commanded 1,500 troops of the 28th Marine Department, yet only 125 had engaged in combat training. He aided in the defense of Biak against the United States Marine Corps, but was killed in the battle for the island after trying to fight off the US landings.

1944 deaths
Japanese military personnel killed in World War II
1890 births
Imperial Japanese Navy admirals